Elaine Tarone is a retired professor of applied linguistics and is a distinguished teaching professor emerita at the University of Minnesota. She is currently a member of the editorial board of The Modern Language Journal.

Early life
Tarone was born in Modesto, California and graduated from Thomas Downey High School in 1962. She spent her freshman year at Modesto Junior College and in 1966 earned a B.A. from the University of California, Berkeley. After a summer volunteering in a street academy in Harlem, New York, she earned a secondary teaching credential at UC Berkeley. She taught English and Spanish for a year at Encinal High School in Alameda, California, and in 1969 earned a diploma in applied linguistics at the Department of Applied Linguistics at Edinburgh University. Transferring to the University of Washington, Seattle, she earned an M.A. (1970) and Ph.D. (1972) in speech science, writing a dissertation on her research on intonation in African-American vernacular English.

Teaching and research
Tarone's published research on second-language acquisition began in 1972, and, includes 10 books and more than 135 papers in scholarly journals and edited volumes. From 1996 until her retirement from the University of Minnesota in 2016, she was director of the university's Center for Advanced Research on Language Acquisition (CARLA). A major research interest has been the sociolinguistic factors affecting second-language acquisition, and she is particularly known for her work on interlanguage, interlanguage variation and the impact of emergent alphabetic print literacy on oral second-language acquisition.

In 1972, she published the first paper on interlanguage phonology, and in 1978, the first research on communication strategies in second-language acquisition. She has also published research on the grammatical-rhetorical structure of academic writing. Between 1984 and 1989, Tarone was editor of the journal Applied Linguistics. In 1991–92, she was the president of the American Association for Applied Linguistics, and in 2012 she was given that association's Distinguished Scholarship and Service Award.

Her 1989 book with George Yule, Focus on the Language Learner, aims to provide a clear overview of second-language acquisition research issues of importance to language teachers. Her co-authored 2009 book Exploring Learner Language helps language teachers develop skills and use tools to analyze learner language samples provided in transcribed videos of adult second-language learners. Her most recent research publications focus on second-language learners' spontaneous language play in oral discourse, and especially the interlanguage variation revealed in oral narratives when learners enact imagined voices of protagonists who are both more- and less-proficient than they are.

References 

Living people
Applied linguists
Linguists from the United States
Women linguists
Bilingualism and second-language acquisition researchers
Year of birth missing (living people)
20th-century American non-fiction writers
20th-century American women writers
University of Minnesota faculty
People from Modesto, California
American women academics
21st-century American women
Presidents of the American Association for Applied Linguistics